Averin or Averina may refer to:
Averin (surname) (fem. Averina), a Russian last name
Averin, a protein found in oats
Averin, common name in Scotland of Rubus chamaemorus, a rhizomatous herb
Averina (Everina) Wollstonecraft, sister of Mary Wollstonecraft